Sandeep Ranade (alias "Naadrang"; born 1981) is an Indian Classical singer and software engineer from Pune. His composition about coronavirus, "Na Corona Karo," was shared extensively on social media. In 2021, he won an Apple Design Award for his app, NaadSadhana.

Career 
Born in Bangalore, Ranade studied computer software and engineering at University of Pune and Johns Hopkins University, later working at Microsoft and Google. He later returned to Pune to focus on music, teach, and build a start-up.

He has given musical concerts in North America and India. As a supporting vocalist, he has accompanied Pandit Jasraj twice at the Sawai Gandharva Sangeet Mahotsav.

Coronavirus Song 
On 18 March 2020, Ranade composed a song in Raag Basant, "Na Corona karo," about how to prevent transmitting the coronavirus just as Indian public health officials began implementing curfews which was circulated widely. Leading musicians commended the song.

Musicianship 
Ranade is a musician of the Mewati gharana and disciple of Pandit Jasraj. He also learned from Shobha Abhyankar and Anjali Joglekar-Ponkshe. Critics have celebrated the lustrous quality of Ranade's voice and musicality.

NaadSadhana for iOS
Ranade has developed an iOS app for practicing riyaaz and developing shrutis, called "NaadSadhana". Utilizing AI, NaadSadhana utilizes iOS's low-latency capabilities for responsive feedback.

Apple Design Award
In 2021, NaadSadhana was awarded Apple Design Award in the "Innovation" category. As of 2021, it was one of only two apps developed by solo Indian developers to win this award and A.R. Rahman congratulated Ranade on the win.

Discography

References

External links 
 Sandeep Ranade
 NaadSadhana for iOS

Hindustani singers
Singers from Maharashtra
Marathi people
Indian Hindus
Marathi-language singers
Marathi playback singers
1981 births
Mewati gharana
21st-century Indian male classical singers
Living people